Charles Mann (8 July 1799 – 24 May 1860) was the first South Australian Advocate-General.

Biography
Mann was born in Syleham, East Suffolk, England, son of Charles Mann and his wife Sarah, née Moxon. Mann was admitted a solicitor in the King's Bench Division and set up practice in Cannon Street, London.

At Captain (Sir) John Hindmarsh's request, Mann was appointed the first South Australian Advocate–General and Crown Solicitor, this included a position on the South Australian Legislative Council. He resigned his office on 17 November 1837 due to a dispute with Governor Hindmarsh.

Mann was a partner with Edward Castres Gwynne for a time, and became master of the Supreme Court of South Australia in 1844, and acting judge in 1849. Mann was appointed crown solicitor in 1850, police magistrate and insolvency commissioner in 1856, and commissioner of the Court of Insolvency and stipendiary magistrate in 1858.

He died at his home in Gilbert Street, Adelaide, on 24 May 1860.

References

1799 births
1860 deaths
Judges of the Supreme Court of South Australia
People from Mid Suffolk District
English emigrants to Australia
Members of the South Australian Legislative Council
19th-century Australian politicians